KEYQ may refer to:

 KEYQ (AM), a radio station (980 AM) licensed to Fresno, California, United States
 Weiser Air Park in Cypress, Texas, United States